Croatian Republic of Herzeg-Bosnia had own vehicle registration plates.

The standard license plates in the Croatian Republic of Herzeg-Bosnia consisted of a two-letter city code which was separated by Coat of arms of the Croatian Republic of Herzeg-Bosnia from three numbers and one or two letters.

City codes 

BU - Busovača
ČA - Čapljina
DR - Derventa
GR - Grude
JA - Jajce
KI - Kiseljak
LI - Livno
LJ - Ljubuški
MO - Mostar
OR - Orašje
PO - Posušje
RA - Rama
ŠB - Široki Brijeg
TG - Tomislavgrad
TR - Travnik
ŽE - Žepče

Related articles 

 Vehicle registration plates of Bosnia and Herzegovina

Croatian Republic of Herzeg-Bosnia